The 1949 Northwestern Wildcats team represented Northwestern University during the 1949 Big Nine Conference football season. In their third year under head coach Bob Voigts, the Wildcats compiled a 4–5 record (3–4 against Big Ten Conference opponents) and finished in seventh place in the Big Ten Conference. Quarterback Don Burson was selected as a first-team All-Big Ten player by both the Associated Press and the United Press.

Schedule

References

Northwestern
Northwestern Wildcats football seasons
Northwestern Wildcats football